Srokowski (feminine Srokowska) is a Polish surname. Notable people with the surname include:

 Mieczysław Srokowski (1873–1910), Polish writer
 Stanisław Srokowski (1872–1950), Polish geographer and politician
 Stanisław Srokowski (writer) (born 1936), Polish writer

Polish-language surnames